The following is a list of mayors of the city of Fortaleza, Brazil.

 , 1890 
 , 1890-1891	
 Joaquim de Oliveira Catunda, 1891-1892	
 Guilherme César da Rocha, 1892-1912	
 João Marinho de Albuquerque Andrade, 1912	
 , 1912-1914, 1921-1923
 , 1914-1918	
 Rubens Monte, 1918-1920	
 Godofredo Maciel, 1920-1921	
 Adolfo Gonçalves de Siqueira, 1923-1924	
 Godofredo Maciel, 1924-1928	
 , 1928-1930, 1935-1936
 , 1930-1931	
 , 1931	
 Tibúrcio Cavalcante, 1931-1933	
 , 1933-1934	
 José Barreira, 1934	
 , 1934-1935	
 , 1935		
 , 1936-1945	
 , 1945	
 Vicente Linhares, 1945-1946	
 Oscar Barbosa, 1946	
 Romeu Coelho Martins, 1946	
 Clóvis Matos, 1946-1947	
 José Leite Maranhão, 1947-1948	
 , 1948-1951, 1955-1959	
 , 1951-1955 	
 , 1959-1963 
 , 1963-1967	
 , 1967-1971	
 , 1971-1975	
 , 1975-1978	
 , 1978-1979	
 , 1979-1982	
 José Aragão e Albuquerque Júnior, 1982-1983	
 , 1983-1985	
 , 1985-1986	
 , 1986-1989
 Ciro Gomes, 1989-1990
 , 1990-1992, 1997-2004
 , 1993-1996 	 
 Luizianne Lins, 2005-2012
 Roberto Cláudio, 2013-2020 
 , 2021

See also
 Fortaleza politics
  (city council)
 
 Timeline of Fortaleza
 List of mayors of largest cities in Brazil (in Portuguese)
 List of mayors of capitals of Brazil (in Portuguese)

References

This article incorporates information from the Portuguese Wikipedia.

Fortaleza